Eva L. Maddox an American commercial interior designer. She has received over 100 awards and commendations over the course of her career. Maddox's early success in the design industry led her to open a design firm, Eva Maddox Associates.

Eva Maddox was born (1943) and raised in a small town in the middle of Tennessee,  Viola, TN. She affirmed her love for design while attending the University of Cincinnati. She graduated in 1966, with a bachelor's degree, from the College of Design, Architecture, Art, and Planning. After graduating she worked in Cincinnati, at Space Design, while her husband Lynn Maddox was in graduate school. She moved to Indiana looking for other design opportunities. Space Design allowed her to create interior designs for any client she was able to find. She moved to Chicago, IL in 1970 and worked as a project director at Richmond, Manhoff + March, which was then one of the cities largest interior firms. Shortly after she took a position at an architecture firm, Meister & Volpe (1971). In 1992 she was inducted into the Interior Design Hall of Fame. In 1994 she cofounded Archeworks with architect Stanley Tigerman. Archeworks is a socially oriented design laboratory and multidisciplinary school. In 2002 she merged with Perkins + Will and became a design principle. On February 1, 2016 Maddox announced that she is retiring from Perkins + Will. Maddox will continue to work with Perkins+Will on special projects, but will devote most of her time to other pursuits. [9]

Upon earning her bachelor's degree in 1966, Maddox began her design career in Cincinnati, Ohio. She worked at an architecture firm, Space Design. She then moved to Indiana in attempt to find other design opportunities. While in Indiana Space Design allowed her to produce interior designs for any clients she could find. She moved to Chicago in 1970, and received a position as project director at Richmond, Manhoff, + March, which at the time was one of the largest interior firms in the city. During this time she wanted to reconnect with an architecture firm, in order to connect the interior design with the architectural structure. This led her to a position at Meister & Volpe in 1971. Due to the large volume of business that Maddox was producing at Meister & Volpe she decided to start her own business.

Maddox pioneered the concept of ‘Branded Environments’. Branded Environments is a research-based design approach that incorporated a client's DNA into the built environment. This approach helps to define how a company presents and represents itself.

Eva Maddox Associated was acquired by Perkins+Will in 2002.   Maddox became design principal of the companies new Perkins+Will /Eva Maddox Branded Environments group. Maddox worked as design principal at Perkins+Will until she retired on February 1, 2016.  Some of her most successful designs at Perkins+Will include Oak Park Public Library (2003), One Haworth Center (2008), and the Intrepid Sea, Air & Space Museum (2009).

Archeworks 
Eva Maddox co-founded Archeworks in 1994, along with architect Stanley Tigerman.

Projects

Awards 
Eva Maddox awards include Honor Awards from the National AIA and IIDA, and numerous Design Excellence Awards for Interior Architecture and Design from the local chapters of the AIA, ASID, SEGD and IIDA. Herawards include: 
 1992 inducted into the Interior Design Hall of Fame 
 1995 Crain’s Chicago Business- One of Chicago’s 100 most influential women 
 1999 inducted into the International Interior Design College of Fellows 
 2000 IIDA Star Award 
 2001 Chicago magazine Chicagoan of the Year 
 2002 Dean of Design Award 
 2006 honorary Doctorate of Fine Arts from the University of Cincinnati
 2007, 2008 Purpose Prize Fellow 
 2011 Contract magazine's LEGEND Award

References

External links
 Presenter at Cusp Conference 2009

American interior designers
Living people
American women interior designers
Year of birth missing (living people)
21st-century American women